Idaea egenaria is a species of geometrid moth. The species was first described by Francis Walker in 1861 as Acidalia egenaria. It is native to Southeast Asia.

References

Sterrhini